Seeing's Believing is a 1922 American silent comedy film directed by Harry Beaumont and starring Viola Dana, Allan Forrest, and Gertrude Astor.

Plot
As described in a film magazine, Diana Webster (Dana), a willful young woman with plenty of money, and Jimmy Harrison (McCullough), her Aunt Sue's (Astor) fiancé, are forced to stay all night in a country hotel because of a storm. Getting a single room, they pretend they are married to satisfy the concerns of the hotel manager. Jimmy sleeps on a cot in the hall, but hotel guest Bruce Terring (Forrest) does not know this. Later, Bruce meets Diana at her home where he is a guest, and his scandalous interpretation of her escapade infuriates the young woman. She decides to teach him a lesson and show him that "seeing is not always believing" by placing him in a similar unusual position. She hires an actor and his wife to frame a badger game on Bruce. However, the couple double-cross her and Diana is forced into a blackmailing scheme which forces Bruce to rescue her, resulting in a snappy but happy ending for Bruce and Diana.

Cast
 Viola Dana as Diana Webster
 Allan Forrest as Bruce Terring 
 Gertrude Astor as Aunt Sue 
 Philo McCullough as Jimmy Harrison 
 Harold Goodwin as Hack Webster 
 Edward Connelly as Henry Scribbins 
 Josephine Crowell as Martha Scribbins 
 Colin Kenny as Mr. Reed 
 Grace Morse as Mrs. Reed 
 J.P. Lockney as Sheriff

References

Bibliography
 James Robert Parish & Michael R. Pitts. Film Directors: a Guide to their American Films. Scarecrow Press, 1974.

External links

1922 films
Silent American comedy films
Films directed by Harry Beaumont
American silent feature films
1920s English-language films
American black-and-white films
Metro Pictures films
1922 comedy films
1920s American films
English-language comedy films